Anuar Tan bin Abdullah is a Malaysian politician and served as Kelantan State Executive Councillor. He is currently the only Chinese assemblyman in the state assembly.

Election Results

Honours
  :
  Knight Commander of the Order of the Life of the Crown of Kelantan (DJMK) – Dato' (2003)

References

Living people
People from Kelantan
Malaysian people of Chinese descent
Malaysian Muslims
Malaysian Islamic Party politicians
Members of the Kelantan State Legislative Assembly
Kelantan state executive councillors
21st-century Malaysian politicians
Year of birth missing (living people)